Kimberley Turner (born 1 February 1985) is a Northern Irish former footballer, who is currently The Girls' Academy Director and Women's First Team Coach at Glentoran FC. Turner played for Manchester City and Northern Ireland as a midfielder.

Club career

Early career
Turner represented Orangefield High School and Belfast United LFC. She toured America in 1999 as part of a cross-community project called Belfast Together.

Senior career
Turner was awarded with a Football Scholarship and played in the NCAA C-USA for the Southern Miss Golden Eagles for four seasons while attending the University of Southern Mississippi. In the summer of 2006 Turner (aged 21) made her first appearance in the WPSL signing for Ajax America Women. She then signed for new WPSL club Claremont Stars for their 2007 season, but made only three appearances due to a knee injury.  

By 2009, Turner was playing in Iceland with Grindavík. 

At the end of the Icelandic season, Turner moved to England to join Manchester City Ladies, before moving on to compete in the Women's Premier League for Blackburn Rovers Ladies in 2010. In 2013, she left Blackburn to rejoin former club Manchester City and make the club's history as the first professional Man City team to compete in the WSL.

International career
Turner is a full Northern Ireland international. She also played for the Northern Ireland underage teams.

Coaching career
In May 2020 Turner was appointed joint manager of Fylde, alongside Danielle Young. She left the position in July 2022. Shortly afterwards she returned to Belfast for an "absolute dream job" as Head of Girls and Women's Academy with Glentoran.

References

External links
IFA bio of Kim Turner
Southern Miss. bio of Kim Turner
Blackburn Rovers bio of Kim Turner

1985 births
Living people
Association footballers from Belfast
Expatriate women's footballers in Iceland
Blackburn Rovers L.F.C. players
Expatriate sportspeople from Northern Ireland in Iceland
Manchester City W.F.C. players
Northern Ireland women's international footballers
Women's association footballers from Northern Ireland
Sheffield F.C. Ladies players
Women's association football midfielders
Kim Turner
Southern Miss Golden Eagles women's soccer players
Fylde Ladies F.C. players